Frog Mortar Creek is a tidal creek in Baltimore County, Maryland. The creek empties into the Middle River and surrounds the northeast and southeast sides of Martin State Airport.

See also
List of Maryland rivers

References

External links
NOAA nautical chart 12278

Tributaries of the Chesapeake Bay
Rivers of Baltimore County, Maryland
Rivers of Maryland